Not one inch was Israeli Prime Minister Menachem Begin's campaign pledge in 1977 to not to return an inch of territory without a peace agreement. By 1983, the phrase became the policy of Israeli Prime Minister Yitzhak Shamir, and it took on a different meaning: The phrase meant that Israel would not cede any territory or land as a part of any compromise. The slogan has been in continuous use in Israel since 1977.

Background
The phrase can be traced back to Israeli Prime Minister Menachem Begin's campaign in 1977. The settlement movement embraced Begin's campaign pledge not to return an inch of territory without a peace agreement. After Begin won office, he returned the Sinai Peninsula to Egypt in return for peace. The Israeli youth group Betar produced a button with the slogan "Not One Inch" prior to the Israel and Egypt peace Treaty.

History
Yitzhak Shamir held the office of Prime Minister of Israel 1983, 1984, and 1986-1992. Shamir's policy ("Not an inch") was a pledge not to cede territory to any other governments. In 1987, Shamir rejected the Peres–Hussein London Agreement, which would have returned much of the territory of West Bank and Gaza to Jordanian control. In 2004, the phrase was revived in The Economist in an article entitled, "No, not an inch". The question at that time was whether then Prime Minister Ariel Sharon should remove Israeli settlements from Gaza. In 2005, Sharon quit the Likud party over the "Not-one-inch" ideology, saying that it was impractical and harmful to Israel's interests.

In 2006, Israeli's elected Ehud Olmert Prime Minister and his election was seen as a rejection of the "not one inch" policy. Ehud Olmert was seen as the person most likely to end the occupation of Palestinian territory in the West Bank.

In 2019, the phrase was repeated in relation to Israeli prime minister Benjamin Netanyahu. Roger Cohen, writing an op-ed for The New York Times, said: "He is a true believer in Greater Israel, and will not give up one inch of the land between the Mediterranean and the Jordan River."

References

Arab–Israeli peace process
Not one inch (policy) 
Territory for peace
Two-state solution
Israeli irredentism